The following radio stations broadcast on AM frequency 790 kHz: The Federal Communications Commission classifies 790 AM as a regional broadcast frequency.

In Argentina 
 LR6 Mitre in Buenos Aires
 LRA22 in San Salvador de Jujuy, Jujuy
 LV19 in Malargüe, Mendoza

In Canada 
No stations in Canada currently use the frequency. CFCW in Camrose, Alberta was the last station to do so but moved to 840 AM on August 1, 2015.

In Mexico 
 XEFE-AM in Nuevo Laredo, Tamaulipas
 XEGAJ-AM in Guadalajara, Jalisco
 XENT-AM in La Paz, Baja California Sur
 XERC-AM in Mexico City
 XESU-AM in Mexicali, Baja California

In the United States

References

Lists of radio stations by frequency